Gerry Baker (1938–2013) was an American soccer player (St Mirren, Manchester City, Hibernian, Ipswich Town, Coventry City).

Gerry Baker or Gerald Baker may also refer to:
Gerry Baker (footballer, born 1938), English footballer (York City)
Gerry Baker (footballer, born 1939), English footballer (Bradford Park Avenue)
Gerald Mauroka Baker (born 1962), American law enforcement officer
Gerald Baker (bowls) (born 1960), South African bowler
 Gerald Baker, American Independent candidate in the 1976 Iowa Senate election and 1984 United States presidential election in Iowa
 Gerald Baker, American priest suspended from the Roman Catholic Diocese of Owensboro

See also
Gerard Baker (born c. 1961), editor and opinion writer for The Wall Street Journal
Jerry Baker (disambiguation)
Jeremy Baker (disambiguation)
Paul Gerald Baker (1910–1942), United States Navy officer